The Hessian Ministry of Higher Education, Research and the Arts is a university and culture ministry in Hesse, Germany. Since January 2019, the minister has been Angela Dorn-Rancke.

History 
The Hessian Ministry of Higher Education, Research and the Arts was established on 4 July 1984 as a spin-off of the Hessian Ministry of Education. The Ministry of Education was then responsible for school and part of the church affairs.

Since 1987, the Hessian Ministry of Higher Education, Research and the Arts has been located in a rented, Gründerzeit office building between the Rheinstraße and Luisenstraße in Wiesbaden, which was used until 1975 as the Wiesbaden main post-office and was then rebuilt and renovated accordingly.

It awards the Goethe-Plakette des Landes Hessen.

Jurisdiction

Tasks 
The Ministry is tasked with extending:
higher education (universities, university hospitals, art, and technical colleges)
scientific research institutions
heritage and preservation
Protection of Cultural Property
Museums and art collections
Theater, music and visual arts
Archives
Libraries

In general, the Ministry is in charge of technical and legal supervision, and the promotion of science and art in Hesse.

Sources 
Neuer Herr in altem Haus. Festschrift zum Einzug des Hessischen Ministeriums für Wissenschaft und Kunst in die "Alte Post“ in Wiesbaden Rheinstraße 23 - 25 / Luisenstraße 10-12. Ohne Ort. 1987.

References 

Organisations based in Wiesbaden
Government of Hesse
1984 establishments in Germany